Requiem for Julius is an album by the jazz group the World Saxophone Quartet released by the Justin Time label. The album features performances by Hamiet Bluiett, John Purcell, Oliver Lake and David Murray and is dedicated to the band's founding member Julius Hemphill.

Reception

The AllMusic review by Michael G. Nastos stated: "A long-overdue official farewell for Hemphill, Requiem for Julius not only harkens back to the sound of WSQ's initial recordings, but indicates that they have plenty of original music left in the tank."

The authors of the Penguin Guide to Jazz Recordings wrote: "Not just for their connection with the WSQ's past, this and the 25th-anniversary record are perhaps the most accessible recordings by the group and they are certainly a good place to start."

All About Jazz's Glenn Astarita commented: "Requiem For Julius is a truly exceptional homage to the late great saxophonist/composer... a durable, multidimensional, fervent and altogether superfine recollection of the late great Julius Hemphill and undoubtedly one of the finest WSQ recordings in recent years. Highly recommended!" Another AAJ reviewer stated: "The quartet... invokes its remarkable ability to trade off between tight arrangements and free improvisation. In fact, it's often hard to tell where the arrangements leave off and the improvisation begins."

Track listing
 "Ebony" (DeJohnette) - 7:45  
 "Free and Independent Thought" (Bluiett) -  3:01  
 "All Praise" (Purcell) - 5:57  
 "Requiem for Julius" (Murray) - 6:46  
 "Le Sport Suite" (Lake) - 7:50  
 "Hurricane Floyd" (Murray) - 10:46  
 "Potato Vamp" (Lake) - 3:42  
 "Tone Poem" (Lake) - 5:54  
 "Blues" (Bluiett, Lake, Murray, Purcell) - 4:11

Personnel
Hamiet Bluiett — baritone saxophone
John Purcell — alto saxophone
Oliver Lake — alto saxophone
David Murray — tenor saxophone

References 

2000 albums
World Saxophone Quartet albums